Dunnose is a cape on the Isle of Wight in the English Channel.  The headland is visible from well out to sea, and is used in navigation.
It has twice been used as the base point for a triangulation of Great Britain. 
The line of accurately surveyed points running north from Dunnose to Clifton in Yorkshire provide the basis for triangulation to determine the positions of all other locations in Britain.

History 
German U-boat  sank off the coast of Dunnose in December 1917.

Location

Dunnose Point lies to the east of Ventnor, and can be reached via the A3055.
It is said to be haunted by HMS Eurydice, which sank off the point on 24 March 1878 with the loss of 300 people.
The bay between Dunnose and St. Catherine's Point to the southeast has a rocky bottom and can be hazardous, 
since the charts may not show all the submerged rocks.

Survey point
Around 1800 Dunnose was taken as a base point for a triangulation of Great Britain, 
in which Captain William Mudge measured a section of the meridional arc running up into Yorkshire.
The triangulation was conducted in 1801 and 1802.
The positions of twenty three points between Dunnose and Beacon Hill, Clifton, near Doncaster, were determined, and the closest possible measurements were made of the distances between the points and the direction from one point to another. 
Doubts were cast on the accuracy of the measurements in 1812, when Joseph Rodriguez pointed out that, if they were accurate, the length of a degree of longitude did not vary with latitude as it should if the earth were flattened at the poles.
The Retriangulation of Great Britain that began in 1935 again took Dunnose as a base point.
Dunnose also was the origin (meridian) of the 6 inch and 1:2500 Ordnance Survey maps for the central group of English counties: they were Derbyshire, Nottinghamshire, Lincolnshire, Staffordshire, Warwickshire, Worcestershire, Leicestershire, Rutlandshire, Northamptonshire, Gloucestershire, Oxfordshire, Buckinghamshire, Wiltshire, Berkshire, Hampshire and the Isle of Wight.

Notes and references
Notes

Citations

Sources

Headlands of the Isle of Wight